Avery DeWitt Johnson (born March 25, 1965) is an American basketball television commentator and former player and coach who most recently served as head coach of the Alabama Crimson Tide men's basketball team. He is currently an NBA and college basketball analyst for CBS Sports.

Johnson spent 16 years in the National Basketball Association as a player, and subsequently served as the head coach of two NBA teams: the Dallas Mavericks and New Jersey/Brooklyn Nets. He led the Mavericks to their first NBA Finals appearance and to three consecutive 50+ win seasons. During his playing days, Johnson was known as the "Little General" for his small stature (by NBA standards), his leadership skills as a point guard, and his close friendship with former San Antonio Spurs teammate David Robinson.

Playing career

College
As a high school senior in 1983, Johnson led New Orleans' St. Augustine High School to a 35–0 record and the Class 4A Louisiana State Championship. Johnson matriculated to New Mexico Junior College before moving on to Cameron University, and finally Southern University, at which in his senior season in 1988 he led NCAA Division I with 13.3 assists per game, an all-time record. In that season, he also averaged 11.4 points per game, making him the first men's Division I player ever to average double figures in points and assists in the same season—a feat that was not duplicated until Jason Brickman of LIU Brooklyn did so in 2013–14.

Upon graduation in 1988, Johnson was not selected in the NBA draft.

NCAA Records
Most assist per game in a career: 12.0  (note: played 2 seasons)
Most assists per games in a season : 13.3  
 (note: 399 total in 30 games as a senior which is second all time)
Most assists in a Junior season: 333
Most assist per game in a junior season: 10.74
Most 20+ assists games in a career: 4  
 Accomplished in only 2 seasons, only 1 other player has 2 which was in 4 seasons
Most 20+ assists in a season: 2 
 Twice in both Junior & Senior seasons

Professional

Palm Beach Stingrays (1988)
Johnson spent the summer of 1988 with the Palm Beach Stingrays of the United States Basketball League. In 43 games, Johnson averaged 1.6 points and 1.7 assists as a reserve. Johnson also played in six playoff games for the Stingrays.

Various NBA teams (1989–1994)
In the 1989–90 season, Johnson played 53 games with 10 starts for the Seattle SuperSonics. He made 18 assists on January 5, 1990 against the Miami Heat.

On October 24, 1990, the SuperSonics traded Johnson to the Denver Nuggets for a conditional pick in the 1997 NBA draft. After playing 21 games, Johnson was waived from the Nuggets in December before signing with the San Antonio Spurs on January 17, 1991. Johnson played 47 games with seven starts for the Spurs and averaged 9.4 points, 2.1 rebounds, and 5.4 assists.

In the beginning of the 1991–92 season, Johnson played 20 games and averaged 5.0 points and 6.8 assists for the Spurs before being waived in December. On January 10, 1992, Johnson signed the first of several 10-day contracts with the Houston Rockets that preceded a longer-term contract. Johnson scored a then-career-high 22 points against the Minnesota Timberwolves on January 28.

Signed as an unrestricted free agent, Johnson returned to the Spurs on November 19, 1992. Promoted to starter, Johnson averaged 8.7 points, 1.9 rebounds, and 7.5 assists and improved his field goal percentage to .502 in 75 games. In the playoffs, Johnson averaged 8.2 points and 8.1 assists.

Johnson signed with the Golden State Warriors on October 25, 1993 and was named team captain just nine days into his signing. Starting 70 of 82 games, Johnson reached a new career high 10.9 points per game along with 5.3 assists per game.

San Antonio Spurs (1994–2001)

Johnson is best known for his time with the Spurs from 1994 to 2001, and particularly his integral role on the 1998–99 Spurs team that won the NBA championship against the New York Knicks. Most notably, Johnson made the go-ahead, championship-clinching shot in Game 5 on a jumper with 47 seconds remaining in the game. The Spurs retired Johnson's number 6 on December 22, 2007. He was also inducted into the San Antonio Sports Hall of Fame on February 20, 2009.

After the Spurs
On July 19, 2001, Johnson signed as a free agent with the Denver Nuggets. Johnson played 51 games (13 starts) with the Nuggets and averaged 9.4 points, 1.3 rebounds, and 5.1 assists. The Nuggets traded Johnson and three other players to the Dallas Mavericks on February 21, 2002. Johnson played 17 games all as a reserve with the Mavericks for the rest of the season.

In the 2002–03 season, Johnson played in 48 games as a reserve for the Mavericks, averaging 9.0 minutes per game. Johnson ended his NBA career in the 2003–04 season back with the Golden State Warriors. He played 46 games with one start and averaged 4.6 points, 0.7 rebounds, and 2.4 assists.

Post-playing career

Dallas Mavericks
On October 28, 2004, Johnson retired from playing and signed as an assistant coach with the Dallas Mavericks under Don Nelson. Johnson had played under Nelson from 1993 to 1994 and from 2002 to 2003, and it was understood from the beginning that he was being groomed to eventually succeed Nelson as head coach. His transition from assistant to head coach came five months later on March 19, 2005, after Nelson resigned.

Under Johnson, the Mavericks closed out the 2004–05 season with a 16–2 run and a first-round playoff victory over the Houston Rockets, before being eliminated by the Phoenix Suns in the second round of the playoffs. Johnson was named the April 2005 NBA Coach of the Month, only one month after becoming a head coach for the first time.

The 2005–06 season was even more successful for Johnson and was marked by a series of milestones. In November 2005, Johnson won his second NBA Coach of the Month award (which was also his second consecutive award, following the one he had won in April the previous season), making him the first NBA coach to win the award in his first two months as a head coach. On January 28, 2006, when the Dallas Mavericks defeated the Utah Jazz, Johnson's record as head coach improved to 50–12, making Johnson the fastest coach to reach 50 wins. In February 2006, he was chosen to coach the 2006 NBA All-Star team for the Western Conference. Although Johnson ultimately led the Mavericks to the second-best record in the Western Conference, the team entered the playoffs as the fourth seed in the West due to the structure of the 2006 NBA Playoffs seeding. In April 2006, Johnson was rewarded for his success throughout the season with the 2006 NBA Coach of the Year Award.

In June 2006, after defeating the Memphis Grizzlies, the defending champion San Antonio Spurs, and the Phoenix Suns in the first three rounds of the playoffs, Johnson led the Mavericks to their first ever NBA Finals appearance. However, the Mavs were defeated in six games by the Miami Heat, losing four straight after winning the first two games.

On December 31, 2006, Johnson became the fastest head coach (at the time) to win 100 games when his squad defeated the Denver Nuggets. This record was later broken by Tom Thibodeau and the Chicago Bulls. In the 2006–07 season, Johnson's Mavericks had the best record in the NBA with 67 wins and entered the playoffs as the top seed. However, his Mavericks lost to the eighth-seeded Golden State Warriors, led by former Mavericks head coach Don Nelson, in one of the biggest upsets in recent NBA history.

With the Mavs' win over the Grizzlies on November 18, 2007, Johnson became the fastest coach to reach 150 wins. Following the 2007–08 season, the Mavericks under Johnson were eliminated in the first round of the playoffs for the second year in a row. A day later, on April 30, 2008, Johnson was dismissed as head coach of the Mavericks and replaced by former NBA Coach of the Year, Rick Carlisle.

First stint at ESPN
On October 17, 2008, Johnson joined ESPN as a studio analyst. He remained in that role for two seasons, until he received an offer to become head coach of the New Jersey Nets.

New Jersey/Brooklyn Nets
On June 10, 2010, Johnson was hired as head coach of the New Jersey Nets, which had just finished a dismal 2009–10 campaign with a 12–70 record. In his first year as coach of the Nets, the team improved slightly, doubling its win total from the previous season and finishing 24–58. However, the next year saw no such improvement, as his team went 22–44 in the lockout-shortened season.

Johnson remained with the Nets when the team moved to Brooklyn in 2012. He was named the Eastern Conference Coach of the Month for October and November 2012 following an 11–4 start to the season. Despite that early success, the team went on to lose ten of its next 13 games, and subsequently Johnson was fired from his head coaching position on December 27, 2012.

Second stint at ESPN
In 2013, Johnson rejoined ESPN to appear as an analyst on SportsCenter, NBA Coast to Coast, and NBA Tonight.

Alabama
On April 5, 2015, ESPN reported that Johnson had verbally agreed to become the new head basketball coach at the University of Alabama, replacing Anthony Grant. The following day, the university officially announced Johnson's hiring as the school's 21st men's basketball coach. After losing in the first round of the 2019 National Invitation Tournament, Alabama and Johnson agreed to mutually part ways.

Personal life
Johnson and his wife Cassandra have two children, Avery Jr. and Christianne. Avery Jr. played  for the Alabama basketball team, coached by his father. Johnson is a Christian.

NBA career statistics

Regular season

|-
| style="text-align:left;"|
| style="text-align:left;"|Seattle
| 43 || 0 || 6.8 || .349 || .111 || .563 || .6 || 1.7 || .5 || .1 || 1.6
|-
| style="text-align:left;"|
| style="text-align:left;"|Seattle
| 53 || 10 || 10.8 || .387 || .250 || .725 || .8 || 3.1 || .5 || .0 || 2.6
|-
| style="text-align:left;"|
| style="text-align:left;"|Denver
| 21 || 4 || 10.3 || .426 || .000 || .656 || 1.0 || 3.7 || .7 || .1 || 3.8
|-
| style="text-align:left;"|
| style="text-align:left;"|San Antonio
| 47 || 10 || 15.8 || .483 || .200 || .691 || 1.2 || 3.3 || .7 || .0 || 5.1
|-
| style="text-align:left;"|
| style="text-align:left;"|San Antonio
| 20 || 14 || 23.3 || .509 || .200 || .750 || 1.8 || 5.0 || 1.1 || .2 || 6.8
|-
| style="text-align:left;"|
| style="text-align:left;"|Houston
| 49 || 1 || 15.8 || .464 || .300 || .609 || .9 || 3.4 || .8 || .1 || 5.1
|-
| style="text-align:left;"|
| style="text-align:left;"|San Antonio
| 75 || 49 || 27.1 || .502 || .000 || .791 || 1.9 || 7.5 || 1.1 || .2 || 8.7
|-
| style="text-align:left;"|
| style="text-align:left;"|Golden State
| 82 || 70 || 28.4 || .492 || .000 || .704 || 2.1 || 5.3 || 1.4 || .1 || 10.9
|-
| style="text-align:left;"|
| style="text-align:left;"|San Antonio
| 82 || 82 || 36.7 || .519 || .136 || .685 || 2.5 || 8.2 || 1.4 || .2 || 13.4
|-
| style="text-align:left;"|
| style="text-align:left;"|San Antonio
| 82 || 82 || 37.6 || .494 || .194 || .721 || 2.5 || 9.6 || 1.5 || .3 || 13.1
|-
| style="text-align:left;"|
| style="text-align:left;"|San Antonio
| 76 || 76 || 32.5 || .477 || .231 || .690 || 1.9 || 6.8 || 1.3 || .2 || 10.5
|-
| style="text-align:left;"|
| style="text-align:left;"|San Antonio
| 75 || 73 || 35.7 || .478 || .154 || .726 || 2.0 || 7.9 || 1.1 || .2 || 10.2
|-
| style="text-align:left; background:#afe6ba;"|†
| style="text-align:left;"|San Antonio
| 50 || 50 || 33.4 || .473 || .083 || .568 || 2.4 || 7.4 || 1.0 || .2 || 9.7
|-
| style="text-align:left;"|
| style="text-align:left;"|San Antonio
| 82 || 82 || 31.4 || .473 || .111 || .735 || 1.9 || 6.0 || .9 || .2 || 11.2
|-
| style="text-align:left;"|
| style="text-align:left;"|San Antonio
| 55 || 20 || 23.5 || .447 || .167 || .683 || 1.5 || 4.3 || .6 || .1 || 5.6
|-
| style="text-align:left;"|
| style="text-align:left;"|Denver
| 51 || 13 || 23.5 || .486 || .000 || .747 || 1.3 || 5.1 || .7 || .2 || 9.4
|-
| style="text-align:left;"|
| style="text-align:left;"|Dallas
| 17 || 0 || 8.9 || .429 ||  || .706 || .3 || 1.6 || .3 || .1 || 3.2
|-
| style="text-align:left;"|
| style="text-align:left;"|Dallas
| 48 || 0 || 9.0 || .420 || .000 || .769 || .6 || 1.3 || .3 || .0 || 3.3
|-
| style="text-align:left;"|
| style="text-align:left;"|Golden State
| 46 || 1 || 13.8 || .402 || .000 || .667 || .7 || 2.4 || .6 || .1 || 4.6
|- class="sortbottom"
| style="text-align:center;" colspan="2"|Career
| 1,054 || 637 || 25.3 || .479 || .145 || .706 || 1.7 || 5.5 || 1.0 || .1 || 8.4

Playoffs

|-
| style="text-align:left;"|1989
| style="text-align:left;"|Seattle
| 6 || 0 || 5.2 || .417 || .000 || .500 || .7 || .8 || .7 || .0 || 1.8
|-
| style="text-align:left;"|1991
| style="text-align:left;"|San Antonio
| 3 || 0 || 6.3 || .000 || .000 || 1.000 || .0 || 1.3 || .3 || .0 || .7
|-
| style="text-align:left;"|1993
| style="text-align:left;"|San Antonio
| 10 || 10 || 31.4 || .514 || .000 || .714 || 3.1 || 8.1 || 1.0 || .1 || 8.2
|-
| style="text-align:left;"|1994
| style="text-align:left;"|Golden State
| 3 || 0 || 13.7 || .529 || .000 ||  || 1.0 || 3.3 || 1.3 || .3 || 6.0
|-
| style="text-align:left;"|1995
| style="text-align:left;"|San Antonio
| 15 || 15 || 38.3 || .517 || .000 || .621 || 2.1 || 8.3 || 1.3 || .4 || 14.5
|-
| style="text-align:left;"|1996
| style="text-align:left;"|San Antonio
| 10 || 10 || 40.7 || .430 || .000 || .704 || 3.6 || 9.4 || 2.0 || .1 || 12.3
|-
| style="text-align:left;"|1998
| style="text-align:left;"|San Antonio
| 9 || 9 || 38.0 || .604 || .000 || .667 || 1.4 || 6.1 || 1.0 || .0 || 17.3
|-
| style="text-align:left; background:#afe6ba;"|1999†
| style="text-align:left;"|San Antonio
| 17 || 17 || 38.4 || .487 || .333 || .681 || 2.5 || 7.4 || 1.2 || .1 || 12.6
|-
| style="text-align:left;"|2000
| style="text-align:left;"|San Antonio
| 4 || 4 || 36.0 || .452 ||  || .714 || 2.3 || 5.3 || 1.0 || .0 || 12.0
|-
| style="text-align:left;"|2001
| style="text-align:left;"|San Antonio
| 13 || 0 || 21.6 || .386 || .000 || .533 || 1.2 || 3.2 || .8 || .1 || 5.8
|- class="sortbottom"
| style="text-align:center;" colspan="2"|Career
| 90 || 65 || 31.2 || .486 || .063 || .661 || 2.1 || 6.2 || 1.1 || .1 || 10.5

Head coaching record

NBA

|-
| style="text-align:left;"|Dallas
| style="text-align:left;"|
| 18||16||2|||| style="text-align:center;"|2nd in Southwest||13||6||7||
| style="text-align:center;"|Lost in Conference Semifinals
|-
| style="text-align:left;"|Dallas
| style="text-align:left;"|
| 82||60||22|||| style="text-align:center;"|2nd in Southwest||23||14||9||
| style="text-align:center;"|Lost in NBA Finals
|-
| style="text-align:left;"|Dallas
| style="text-align:left;"|
| 82||67||15|||| style="text-align:center;"|1st in Southwest||6||2||4||
| style="text-align:center;"|Lost in first round
|-
| style="text-align:left;"|Dallas
| style="text-align:left;"|
| 82||51||31|||| style="text-align:center;"|4th in Southwest||5||1||4||
| style="text-align:center;"|Lost in first round
|-
| style="text-align:left;"|New Jersey
| style="text-align:left;"|
| 82||24||58|||| style="text-align:center;"|4th in Atlantic||—||—||—||—
| style="text-align:center;"|Missed playoffs
|-
| style="text-align:left;"|New Jersey
| style="text-align:left;"|
| 66||22||44|||| style="text-align:center;"|5th in Atlantic||—||—||—||—
| style="text-align:center;"|Missed playoffs
|-
| style="text-align:left;"|Brooklyn
| style="text-align:left;"|
| 28||14||14|||| style="text-align:center;"|(fired)||—||—||—||—
| style="text-align:center;"|—
|- class="sortbottom"
| style="text-align:center;" colspan="2"|Career||440||254||186|||| ||47||23||24||||

College

See also
List of National Basketball Association career assists leaders
List of NCAA Division I men's basketball players with 20 or more assists in a game

References

External links

Avery Johnson coach profile at NBA.com
Avery Johnson NBA coaching statistics at Basketball-Reference.com

1965 births
Living people
20th-century African-American sportspeople
21st-century African-American people
African-American basketball coaches
African-American basketball players
African-American Christians
American men's basketball coaches
American men's basketball players
Basketball coaches from Louisiana
Basketball players from New Orleans
Brooklyn Nets head coaches
Cameron Aggies men's basketball players
College basketball announcers in the United States
Dallas Mavericks assistant coaches
Dallas Mavericks head coaches
Dallas Mavericks players
Denver Nuggets players
Golden State Warriors players
Houston Rockets players
National Basketball Association broadcasters
National Basketball Association players with retired numbers
New Jersey Nets head coaches
NMJC Thunderbirds men's basketball players
Point guards
San Antonio Spurs players
Seattle SuperSonics players
Southern Jaguars basketball players
Sportspeople from New Orleans
St. Augustine High School (New Orleans) alumni
Undrafted National Basketball Association players
United States Basketball League players